Harshavardhan Kulkarni is an Indian film director, screenwriter and producer.

Early life
He is the son of Kannada poet G.V. Kulkarni. He is an alumnus of Don Bosco, Borivali, MIT, Pune & FTII, Pune, Pune University.

Career
His directorial debut feature film Hunterrr was released in 2015. Hunterrr is Harsh's debut as a director, produced by Phantom Films and Shemaroo got attached to the film for marketing and distribution. His second film was Badhaai Do, starring Bhumi Pednekar and Raj Kumar Rao which was released in theatres on 11 February 2022.

Filmography

References

External links
 

Living people
Hindi-language film directors
Hindi screenwriters
Year of birth missing (living people)
Place of birth missing (living people)